Marduk (Cuneiform:  dAMAR.UTU; Sumerian: amar utu.k "calf of the sun; solar calf") was a god from ancient Mesopotamia and patron deity of the city of Babylon. When Babylon became the political center of the Euphrates valley in the time of Hammurabi (18th century BC), Marduk slowly started to rise to the position of the head of the Babylonian pantheon, a position he fully acquired by the second half of the second millennium   BC. In the city of Babylon, Marduk was worshipped in the temple Esagila. Marduk is associated with the divine weapon Imhullu. His symbolic animal and servant, whom Marduk once vanquished, is the dragon Mušḫuššu. "Marduk" is the Babylonian form of his name.

The name Marduk was pronounced Marutuk. The etymology of the name Marduk is conjectured as derived from amar-Utu ("immortal son of Utu" or "bull calf of the sun god Utu"). The origin of Marduk's name may reflect an earlier genealogy, or have had cultural ties to the ancient city of Sippar (whose god was Utu), dating to the third millennium BC.

By the Hammurabi period, Marduk had become astrologically associated with the planet Jupiter.

Background

Neo-Assyrian texts had become more critical of the Mesopotamian kings. The location of Marduk's statue, whether in Babylon or not, was related to the relationship between foreign kingship and traditional Babylonian religion. In the 12th century BC, during the reign of Nebuchadnezzar I, the statue of Marduk (previously captured by Elamites) was restored to Babylon. The Marduk Prophecy is a prophetic text discussing three occasions on which Babylon is abandoned by Marduk. Some of the details are obscured by a lacuna. The reference to Marduk's reign in Hatti is believed to correspond to the Hittite king Mursili I's capture of Marduk's statue (later returned to Babylon by Kassite king Agum II). Marduk blesses and lives in Assur, a reference to another conflict - this time between the Assyrian king and the Kassite king Kastilias IV, that ended with Marduk's statue being moved from Babylon to Assyria. According to the text Babylon falls into a chaos while Marduk is in Elam, referring to Babylon's defeat at the hands of the Elamite king. It says a new king will arise to renew the temple Ekursagila, most likely a reference to Nebuchadnezzar I's victory over Elam and restoration of Marduk's statue to Babylon.

Marduk's original character is obscure but he was later associated with water, vegetation, judgment, and magic. His consort was the goddess Sarpanit. He was also regarded as the son of Ea (Sumerian Enki) and Damkina, and the heir of Anu, but whatever special traits Marduk may have had were overshadowed by political developments in the Euphrates valley  which led to people of the time imbuing him with traits belonging to gods who in an earlier period were recognized as the heads of the pantheon. There are particularly two gods—Ea and Enlil—whose powers and attributes pass over to Marduk.

In the case of Ea, the transfer proceeded peacefully and without effacing the older god. Marduk took over the identity of Asarluhi, the son of Ea and god of magic, and was thus integrated into the pantheon of Eridu, where both Ea and Asarluhi originated. Ea, Marduk's father, voluntarily recognized the superiority of the son and handed over to him the control of humanity. This association of Marduk and Ea, while indicating primarily the passing to Babylon of the religious and political supremacy once enjoyed by Eridu, may also reflect an early dependence of Babylon upon Eridu, not necessarily of a political character but, in view of the spread of culture in the Euphrates valley from the south to the north, the recognition of Eridu as the older centre on the part of the younger one.

Late Bronze Age
While the relationship between Ea and Marduk is marked by harmony and an amicable abdication on the part of the father in favour of his son, Marduk's absorption of the power and prerogatives of Enlil of Nippur came at the expense of the latter's prestige. Babylon became independent in the early 19th century BC, and was initially a small city state, overshadowed by older and more powerful Mesopotamian states such as Isin, Larsa and Assyria. The rise of "Marduk is closely connected with the political rise of Babylon from city-state to the capital of an empire." Marduk became the supreme god after the reign of Nebuchadnezzar I in the twelfth century, replacing Enlil. Although Nippur and the cult of Enlil enjoyed a period of renaissance during the more than four centuries of Kassite control in Babylonia (c. 1595 BC–1157 BC), the definite and permanent triumph of Marduk over Enlil became felt in Babylonia.

During the Kassite reign, the Babylonians were attacked by the Assyrians, who captured the statue of Marduk. Aššur (Ashur), the supreme god in the north, was considered to be the only rival of Marduk, who reigned supreme in the South. While the statue was brought back to Babylon, the Kassite dynasty with a weakened defense fell to the Elamites (1157 BC), and the statue of Marduk was taken to Susa, the Elam capital. Assyria remained an enemy of the Babylonians until the reign of Marduk-nadin-ahhe (1082–1070 BC).

The deity of Marduk results in the Enûma Elish, which tells the story of Marduk's birth, heroic deeds and becoming the ruler of the gods. The purpose of this creation myth was to explain how Marduk came to power. This can be viewed as a form of Mesopotamian apologetics. Also included in this document are the fifty names of Marduk that represent everything Marduk symbolizes.

In Enûma Elish, a civil war between the gods was growing to a climactic battle. The Anunnaki gods gathered together to find one god who could defeat the gods rising against them. Marduk, a very young god, answered the call and was promised the position of head god.

To prepare for battle, he makes a bow, fletches arrows, grabs a mace, throws lightning before him, fills his body with flame, makes a net to encircle Tiamat within it, gathers the four winds so that no part of her could escape, creates seven nasty new winds such as the whirlwind and tornado, and raises up his mightiest weapon, the rain-flood. Then he sets out for battle, mounting his storm-chariot drawn by four horses with poison in their mouths. In his lips he holds a spell and in one hand he grasps a herb to counter poison.

First, he challenges the leader of the Anunnaki gods, the dragon of the primordial sea Tiamat, to single combat and defeats her by trapping her with his net, blowing her up with his winds, and piercing her belly with an arrow.

Then, he proceeds to defeat Kingu, who Tiamat put in charge of the army and wore the Tablets of Destiny on his breast, "wrested from him the Tablets of Destiny, wrongfully his", and assumed his new position. Under his reign, humans were created to bear the burdens of life so the gods could be at leisure; the lowly creatures built Marduk a temple in Babylon (from Akkadian bāb-il and Sumerian KÁ.DINGIR both literally translated 'Gate of God'; cf. Genesis 11:9).

Marduk was depicted as a human, often with his symbol the snake-dragon which he had taken over from the god Tishpak. Another symbol that stood for Marduk was the spade.

Babylonian texts talk of the creation of Eridu by the god Marduk as the first city, "the holy city, the dwelling of their [the other gods'] delight". However, Eridu was founded in the 5th millennium BC and Marduk's ascendancy only occurred in the second millennium BC, so this is clearly a revisionist back-dating to inflate the prestige of Marduk.

Fifty names
Leonard W. King in The Seven Tablets of Creation (1902)  included fragments of god lists which he considered essential for the reconstruction of the meaning of Marduk's name. Franz Böhl in his 1936 study of the fifty names also referred to King's list.
Richard Litke (1958) noticed a similarity between Marduk's names in the An:Anum list and those of the Enuma elish, albeit in a different arrangement.
The connection between the An:Anum list and the list in Enuma Elish were established by  Walther Sommerfeld (1982), who used the correspondence to argue for a Kassite period composition date of the Enuma elish, although the direct derivation of the Enuma elish list from the An:Anum one was disputed in a review by Wilfred Lambert (1984).

Marduk Prophecy

The Marduk Prophecy is a vaticinium ex eventu text (a prophecy written after the events) describing the travels of the Marduk cult statue from Babylon. It relates its visits to the land of Ḫatti, corresponding to the statue's seizure during the sack of the city by Mursili I in 1595 BC (middle chronology); to Assyria, when Tukulti-Ninurta I overthrew Kashtiliash IV, taking the image to Assur in 1225 BC; and to Elam, when Kudur-Nahhunte ransacked the city and pilfered the statue around 1160 BC.  Marduk addresses the prophecy to an assembly of the gods.
 
The first two sojourns are described in glowing terms as good for both Babylon and the other places Marduk has graciously agreed to visit. The episode in Elam, however, is a disaster, where the gods have followed Marduk and abandoned Babylon to famine and pestilence. Marduk prophesies that he will return once more to Babylon to a messianic new king, who will bring salvation to the city and who will wreak a terrible revenge on the Elamites. This king is understood to be Nabu-kudurri-uṣur I, 1125–1103 BC. Thereafter the text lists various sacrifices.
 
A copy was discovered in The House of Exorcist in the city of Assur and was written between 713–612 BC. It is closely related thematically to another vaticinium ex eventu text called the Shulgi prophecy, which probably followed it in a sequence of tablets. Both compositions present a favorable view of Assyria.

Bel

During the first millennium BC, the Babylonians worshipped a deity under the title "Bel", meaning "lord", who was a syncretization of Marduk, Enlil, and the dying god Dumuzid. Bel held all the cultic titles of Enlil and his status in the Babylonian religion was largely the same. Eventually, Bel came to be seen as the god of order and destiny. The cult of Bel is a major component of the Jewish story of "Bel and the Dragon" from the apocryphal additions to Daniel. In the account, the Babylonians offer "twelve bushels of fine flour, twenty sheep, and fifty gallons of wine" every day to an idol of Bel and the food miraculously disappears overnight. The Persian king Cyrus the Great tells the Jewish wise man Daniel that the idol is clearly alive, because it eats the food that is offered to it, but Daniel objects that it "is only clay on the inside, and bronze on the outside, and has never tasted a thing." Daniel proves this by secretly covering the floor of the temple with ash. Daniel and Cyrus leave the temple and, when they return, Daniel shows the king the human footprints that have been left on the floor, proving that the food is really being eaten by the seventy priests of Bel. Bel is also mentioned in the writings of several Greek historians.

See also
Assyrian religion
Baal
Babylonian religion
Berossus
Etemenanki
Nebuchadnezzar II
Sacred bull
Zakmuk

Notes

Citations

References

External links

Ancient Mesopotamian Gods and Goddesses: Marduk (god)
Enuma Elish - The Babylonian Creation Story

Baal
Deities in the Hebrew Bible
Dragonslayers
Characters in the Enūma Eliš
Creator deities
Jovian deities
Justice gods
Magic gods
Mesopotamian gods
Nature gods
Tutelary gods
Water gods
Creator gods
Medicine gods
Agricultural gods